In protein structure, a ferredoxin fold is a common α+β protein fold with a signature βαββαβ secondary structure along its backbone.  Structurally, the ferredoxin fold can be regarded as a long, symmetric hairpin that is wrapped once around, so that its two terminal β-strands hydrogen-bond to the central two β-strands, forming a four-stranded, antiparallel β-sheet covered on one side by two α-helices.

External links
 SCOP list of proteins with a ferredoxin-like fold

References

Protein folds